The Supreme Court of Illinois is the state supreme court, the highest court of the State of Illinois. The court's authority is granted in Article VI of the current Illinois Constitution, which provides for seven justices elected from the five appellate judicial districts of the state: three justices from the First District (Cook County) and one from each of the other four districts. Each justice is elected for a term of ten years and the chief justice is elected by the court from its members for a three-year term.

Jurisdiction
The court has limited original jurisdiction and has final appellate jurisdiction. It has jurisdiction in cases where the constitutionality of laws has been called into question, and discretionary jurisdiction from the Illinois Appellate Court. Until 2011, when Illinois abolished the death penalty, it had mandatory jurisdiction in capital cases. Along with the state legislature, the court promulgates rules for all state courts. Also, its members have the authority to elevate trial judges to the appellate court on a temporary basis.  The court administers professional discipline through the Attorney Registration and Disciplinary Committee and it governs initial licensing through the Illinois Board of Admissions to the Bar.

The official reporter of the Illinois Supreme Court is Illinois Reports.

Districts

The Illinois Supreme Court is separated into 5 districts, with one Justice elected from each except the 1st, which elects three Justices. The districts are separated along county lines. 

These districts were first established in 1963 and had not been updated in nearly sixty years, despite the Illinois Constitution's requirement that the four districts outside the 1st District (Cook County) have "substantially equal population". As of 2018 Census estimates, the populations of the old districts before the 2021 redistricting were: 1st District: 5,194,000; 2nd District: 3,189,000; 3rd District: 1,805,000; 4th District 1,320,000; 5th District: 1,321,000. In comparison, the 2020 Census reports the populations of the current districts as: 1st District: 5,275,541; 2nd District: 1,773,382; 3rd District: 1,959,246; 4th District 2,086,825; 5th District: 1,717,514. The state legislature redrew districts in 2021 to take effect in the 2022 elections, Illinois Governor J.B. Pritzker signed these changes into law.

Below are the counties per district based on the 2021 redistricting. Only the first district has remained entirely the same.

1st district
Cook

2nd district

DeKalb
Kane
Kendall
Lake
McHenry

3rd district

Bureau
DuPage
Grundy
Iroquois
Kankakee
LaSalle
Will

4th district

Adams
Boone
Brown
Calhoun
Carroll
Cass
Ford
Fulton
Greene
Hancock
Henderson
Henry
Jersey
Jo Daviess
Knox
Lee
Livingston
Logan
Macoupin
Marshall
Mason
McDonough
McLean
Menard
Mercer
Morgan
Ogle
Peoria
Piatt
Pike
Putnam
Rock Island
Sangamon
Schuyler
Scott
Stark
Stephenson
Tazewell
Vermilion
Warren
Winnebago
Whiteside
Woodford

5th district

Alexander
Bond
Champaign
Christian
Clark
Clay
Clinton
Coles
Crawford
Cumberland
DeWitt
Douglas
Edgar
Edwards
Effingham
Fayette
Franklin
Gallatin
Hamilton
Hardin
Jackson
Jasper
Jefferson
Johnson
Lawrence
Macon
Madison
Marion
Massac
Monroe
Montgomery
Moultrie
Perry
Pope
Pulaski
Randolph
Richland
Saline
Shelby
St. Clair
Union
Wabash
Washington
Wayne
White
Williamson

Qualifications and elections

Justices are required to be U.S. citizens, members of the state bar, and resident in the district from which they are elected or appointed.  Justices run in a general election for a 10-year term.  At the end of the initial term, they may run in a non-partisan retention election where they must receive 60% of the vote to be retained for continuing terms of ten-years.  When a vacancy occurs mid-term, the Supreme Court itself appoints a new justice.  The appointed justice must run in the next partisan election (including primaries) that is more than 60 days from their appointment for a 10-year term to hold the seat.  The court elects the chief justice from among its members for a three-year term.

Justices
While the justices of many states' supreme courts are expected to relocate to the state capital for the duration of their terms of office, the justices of the Illinois Supreme Court continue to reside in their home constituencies and have chambers in their respective appellate districts (for example, the three First District justices are chambered in the Michael Bilandic Building in Chicago). The justices travel to Springfield to hear oral arguments and deliberate. Accordingly, the Illinois Supreme courthouse building includes apartments for the justices' use while in Springfield.

Current justices

Previous justices

2000–present
 Thomas R. Fitzgerald (2000–2010)
 Philip J. Rarick (2002–2004)
 Robert R. Thomas (2000–2020)
 Thomas L. Kilbride (2000–2020)
 Rita Garman (2001–2022)
 Anne M. Burke (2006–2022)
 Michael J. Burke (2020–2022)
 Robert L. Carter (2020–2022)

1900–1999

 Charles E. Freeman (1990–2018)
 S. Louis Rathje (1999–2000)
 Michael Anthony Bilandic (1994–1997)
 Mary Ann McMorrow (1992–2006)
 Moses Harrison (1992–2002)
 John L. Nickels (1992–1998)
 Benjamin K. Miller (1984–2001)
 Joseph F. Cunningham (1991–1992)
 James D. Heiple (1990–2000)
 Horace L. Calvo (1988–1991)
 John J. Stamos (1988–1990)
 Joseph F. Cunningham (1987–1988)
 Seymour Simon (1980–1988)
 Thomas E. Kluczynski (1978–1980)
 William G. Clark (1976–1992)
 Caswell J. Crebs (1975–1976)
 Thomas J. Moran (1976–1992)
 James A. Dooley (1976–1978)
 Howard C. Ryan (1970–1990)
 Joseph H. Goldenhersh (1970–1987)
 Charles H. Davis (2nd time, 1970–1975)
 Marvin Burt (1969–1970)
 Caswell J. Crebs (1969–1970)
 John T. Culbertson Jr. (1969–1970)
 Thomas E. Kluczynski (1966–1976)
 Daniel P. Ward (1966–1990)
 Robert C. Underwood (1962–1984)
 Roy Solfisburg  (1962–1963)
 Byron O. House (1957–1969)
 Charles H. Davis (1st time, 1955–1960)
 Ray Klingbiel (1953–1969)
 Walter V. Schaefer (1951–1976)
 Harry B. Hershey (1951–1966)
 George W. Bristow (1951–1961)
 Ralph L. Maxwell (1951–1956)
 Albert M. Crampton (1948–1953)
 Joseph E. Daily (1948–1965)
 Jesse L. Simpson (1947–1951)
 Charles H. Thompson (1942–1950)
 William J. Fulton (1942–1954)
 June C. Smith (1941–1947)
 Loren E. Murphy (1939–1948)
 Walter T. Gunn (1938–1951)
 Francis S. Wilson (1935–1951)
 Elwyn Riley Shaw (1933–1942)
 Lott R. Herrick (1933–1937)
 Paul Farthing (1933–1942)
 Norman L. Jones (1931–1940)
 Warren H. Orr (1930–1939)
 Paul Samuell (1929–1930)
 Cyrus E. Dietz (1928–1929)
 Oscar E. Heard (1927–1928)
 Frank K. Dunn (1907–1933)
 Frederic R. DeYoung (1924–1934)
 Oscar E. Heard (1924–1933)
 Floyd E. Thompson (1919–1928)
 Clyde E. Stone (1918–1948)
 Warren W. Duncan (1915–1933)
 Albert Watson (1915–1915)
 Charles C. Craig (1913–1918)
 George A. Cooke (1909–1919)
 Frank K. Dunn (1907–1933)
 Orrin N. Carter (1906–1924)
 Alonzo K. Vickers (1906–1915)
 William M. Farmer (1906–1931)
 Guy C. Scott (1903–1909)
 James B. Ricks (1901–1906)
 John P. Hand (1900–1913)

1818–1899

 Carroll C. Boggs (1897–1906)
 Joseph N. Carter (1894–1903)
 James H. Cartwright (1895–1924)
 Jesse J. Phillips (1893–1901)
 Joseph M. Bailey (1888–1895)
 Jacob W. Wilkin (1888–1907)
 Benjamin D. Magruder (1885–1906)
 Simeon P. Shope (1885–1894)
 Damon G. Tunnicliff (1885–1885)
 David J. Baker Jr. (1888–1897)
 John H. Mulkey (1879–1888)
 David J. Baker Jr. (1878–1879)
 T. Lyle Dickey (1875–1885)
 Alfred M. Craig (1873–1900)
 John Scholfield (1873–1893)
 William K. McAllister (1870–1875)
 Benjamin R. Sheldon (1870–1888)
 John M. Scott (1870–1888)
 Anthony Thornton (1870–1873)
 Charles B. Lawrence (1864–1873)
 Corydon Beckwith (1864–1864)
 Pinkney H. Walker (1858–1888)
 Sidney Breese (1857–1878)
 Onias C. Skinner (1855–1858)
 Walter B. Scates (1853–1857)
 Lyman Trumbull (1848–1853)
 David M. Woodson (1848–1848)
 Jesse B. Thomas Jr. (1847–1848)
 William A. Denning (1847–1848)
 Norman H. Purple (1845–1848)
 Gustavus P. Koerner (1845–1848)
 James Shields (1843–1845)
 Jesse B. Thomas Jr. (1843–1845)
 John D. Caton (1843–1864)
 John M. Robinson (1843–1843)
 Richard M. Young (1843–1847)
 James Semple (1843–1843)
 John Dean Caton (1842–1843)
 Stephen A. Douglas (1841–1843)
 Samuel H. Treat (1841–1855)
 Walter B. Scates (1841–1847)
 Sidney Breese (1841–1843)
 Thomas Ford (1841–1842)
 Theophilus W. Smith (1825–1842)
 Samuel D. Lockwood (1825–1848)
 Thomas Reynolds (1822–1825)
 William Wilson (1819–1848)
 Joseph Phillips (1818–1822)
 Thomas C. Browne (1818–1848)
 William P. Foster (1818–1819)
 John Reynolds (1818–1825)

See also 
 Judiciary of Illinois

References

Bibliography 
 List of Supreme Court Justices from Supreme Court's website

External links 
 Illinois Supreme Court website
 A Chronicle of the Illinois Supreme Court
 Illinois State Judiciary
 Chief Justices of the Illinois Supreme Court
 Illinois Supreme Court Historic Preservation Commission

Springfield, Illinois
 
1818 establishments in Illinois Territory
Courts and tribunals established in 1818